Stewart Moss (November 27, 1937 – September 13, 2017) was an American actor, writer, and director.

Early years
Moss was born in Chicago, Illinois, of Irish descent on his father's side and his mother was a daughter of immigrants from Italy. He graduated from Marquette University in 1959. Subsequently, he attended Yale School of Drama on a one-year scholarship.

Career
On Broadway, Moss appeared in Seidman and Son (1962).

Moss's film credits included roles in In Harm's Way (1965) (his film debut), Chubasco (1968), Pendulum (1969), the Hitchcock movie Topaz (1969), Zig Zag (1970), Fuzz (1972), Stacey (1973), Doctor Death: Seeker of Souls (1973), The Bat People (1974), The Last Married Couple in America (1980) and Raise the Titanic (1980). He made eight guest appearances on Hogan's Heroes, starring Bob Crane, from 1965 to 1971. He also made two guest appearances on Perry Mason, first as murder victim David Cartwell in the 1964 episode, "The Case of the Paper Bullets," and Dan Swanson in "The Case of the Dead Ringer," in 1966 when star Raymond Burr doubled as Mason and murderer Grimes.  Moss also appeared in two episodes of Star Trek: The Original Series:  "The Naked Time" as Lt. Joe Tormolen, and "By Any Other Name" as Hanar.  He appeared in the TV series The Invaders episode titled "Inquisition" as Hadley Jenkins (1968). He appeared in such TV shows as Wheels, Murder, She Wrote, Hogan's Heroes, Matlock, Riptide, Cagney and Lacey, Magnum, P.I., Barnaby Jones,  Baa Baa Black Sheep episode "The Meatball Circus", The Rockford Files, Cannon, Kojak, The Silent Force, and Bonanza. 

Moss appeared in two episodes of Cannon: the 1971 episode "Death Chain" as Don Woodard and the 1973 episode "Trial by Terror" as Ross Vernon. 

In 1974, he appeared in the teleplay The Missiles of October, playing Kenneth O'Donnell.

In addition to acting, Moss has also written and directed.  He wrote an episode of Trapper John, M.D. called "Old Man Liver", and he directed a stage production of Sweet Charity starring Bebe Neuwirth.  He won a Drama-Logue Award for directing the stage production of The Shadow Box at Theatre East.

In 1968, Moss married actress Marianne McAndrew and co-starred with her in the film The Bat People. Moss died in September 2017 at the age of 79.

Bibliography

Filmography

References

External links 
 
 
 
 

1937 births
2017 deaths
American male film actors
American male television actors
American television writers
Male actors from Chicago
American male television writers
American people of Irish descent
Screenwriters from Illinois